Charles Eugene Boucher (December 1, 1864February 1926) was a Canadian politician. He served on the North-West Legislative Assembly for Batoche from 1891 to 1898.

Early life 
Charles Eugene Boucher was born December 1, 1864 to Jean Baptiste Boucher and Caroline Lesperance. Boucher's maternal grandfather was voyageur Alexis Bonami. On August 18, 1886, Boucher married Helene Letendre, the daughter of François-Xavier Letendre.

Political life 
Boucher contested the Batoche electoral district in the 1891 North-West Territories general election. He initially lost the election to Charles Nolin, who was subsequently removed from office by a court order after being found guilty of bribery and fraud. Boucher was re-elected in the 1894 North-West Territories general election, defeating David Venne with 101 votes to 76. In the 1898 North-West Territories general election Boucher was defeated by Charles Fisher, 76 votes to 54.

Later life 
Boucher moved to Montana and lived in the Musselshell River area from 1898 to 1908 before returning to Saskatchewan. Boucher died in February 1926 at the age of 61.

References 

1864 births
1926 deaths
Members of the Legislative Assembly of the Northwest Territories
People from Central Plains Region, Manitoba
Métis politicians